VII (7th) Corps is a military corps of the Korean People's Army headquartered in Hamhung. On 2015 a soldier from the corps defected to South Korea.

References

Corps0007